Marsh muhly is a common name for several plants native to North America and may refer to:

Muhlenbergia glomerata
Muhlenbergia racemosa